The Elizabethan Stage Society was a theatrical society dedicated to putting on productions of drama from the Elizabethan and Jacobean eras, particularly (but not exclusively) those of William Shakespeare. It was founded in 1895 by William Poel. Its minimal scenery, platform stage, quick scene changes and emphasis on the poetry was in direct and deliberate contrast to Herbert Beerbohm Tree and Henry Irving's large-set productions, and were a major influence on later staging and production of these works. Walter Nugent Monck was its stage manager in the 1920s, and its actors included Ben Greet

Writing in 1913, Frederick Rogers, a colleague through his work with the Elizabethan Society of Toynbee Hall, says of Poel and his work:

Poel Workshops
The Society for Theatre Research runs an annual set of set of "Poel Workshops" dedicated to the actor's aims.

References

External links
William Poel Collection, National Art Library

William Shakespeare
Performing groups established in the 1890s
Arts organizations established in 1895
1895 establishments in the United Kingdom